Polyhymnia (minor planet designation: 33 Polyhymnia) is a main belt asteroid that was discovered by French astronomer Jean Chacornac on October 28, 1854 and named after Polyhymnia, the Greek Muse of sacred hymns.

Photometric observations of this asteroid at the Organ Mesa Observatory in Las Cruces, New Mexico during 2008 gave a light curve with a period of 18.609 ± 0.002 hours and a brightness variation of 0.15 ± 0.02 in magnitude. This result is in good agreement with a previous study performed during 1980. These results were re-examined with additional observations in 2011, yielding a refined estimate of 18.608 ± 0.001 hours and a brightness variation of 0.18 ± 0.02 magnitude.

Due to its high eccentricity (0.338), one of the highest for a lower numbered minor planet, on rare close approaches it can reach tenth magnitude, as on September 8, 2014, when it will be apparent magnitude 9.9 and 0.894 AU from Earth. The orbit of 33 Polyhymnia puts it in a 22:9 mean motion resonance with the planet Jupiter. The computed Lyapunov time for this asteroid is 10,000 years, indicating that it occupies a chaotic orbit that will change randomly over time because of gravitational perturbations of the planets. Measurements of the position for this asteroid from 1854 to 1969 were used to determination the gravitational influence of Jupiter upon 33 Polyhymnia. This yields an inverse mass ratio of 1,047.341 ± 0.011 for Jupiter relative to the sun.

Polyhymnia has been studied by radar.

References

External links
 
 

Background asteroids
Polyhymnia
Polyhymnia
S-type asteroids (Tholen)
Sq-type asteroids (SMASS)
18541028